John Maisano (born 6 January 1979) is an Australian soccer coach and former player who is head coach of Melbourne City FC's NPL side. At club level, he played for Atalanta, Westerlo, Helmond Sport, Marconi Stallions, Greenock Morton, Ayr United and Stranraer. Internationally, he represented Australia at the 1995 FIFA U-17 World Championship and 1999 FIFA World Youth Championship.

Club career 
Maisano helped Greenock Morton win the 2002–03 Scottish Third Division title, after beating Peterhead on the final day of the season. After Morton he had brief spells at Ayr United and Stranraer.

Maisano retired from playing professionally in 2006, aged only 27, after suffering health issues.

Managerial career 
In 2016, Maisano became a coach for the Bulleen Lions under-20 side in Victoria. His Melbourne City FC NPL3 side won automatic promotion to the NPLM2 in 2022, missing out on the championship to Preston on the final day of the season.

Personal life 
In 2011, Maisano and his wife decided to return to Australia settling in Mornington Peninsula and launching their business venture Alien Fitness.

Career statistics

Club

References

1979 births
Living people
Australian people of Italian descent
Australian soccer players
Soccer players from Melbourne
Association football midfielders
Belgian Pro League players
Eerste Divisie players
National Soccer League (Australia) players
Scottish Football League players
Atalanta B.C. players
K.V.C. Westerlo players
Helmond Sport players
Marconi Stallions FC players
Greenock Morton F.C. players
Ayr United F.C. players
Stranraer F.C. players
Australian expatriate soccer players
Australian expatriate sportspeople in Italy
Expatriate footballers in Italy
Australian expatriate sportspeople in Belgium
Expatriate footballers in Belgium
Australian expatriate sportspeople in the Netherlands
Expatriate footballers in the Netherlands
Australian expatriate sportspeople in Scotland
Expatriate footballers in Scotland
Australian Institute of Sport soccer players